Robert White (6 March 1895 – 23 April 1982) was an Australian rules footballer who played with Carlton in the Victorian Football League (VFL).

Notes

External links 

Robert White's profile at Blueseum

1895 births
1982 deaths
Australian rules footballers from Melbourne
Carlton Football Club players
People from Brunswick, Victoria